Since 1840, the United States has had diplomatic representation in the Italian Republic and its predecessor nation, the Kingdom of Italy, with a break in relations from 1941 to 1944 while Italy and the U.S. were at war during World War II. The U.S. Mission to Italy is headed by the Embassy of the United States in Rome, and also includes six consular offices. 

Beginning in 2006, the U.S. Ambassador to Italy is concurrently accredited as the U.S. Ambassador to San Marino.

List of U.S. ambassadors to Italy
Listed below are the head U.S. diplomatic agents in Italy, their diplomatic rank, and the effective start and end of their service in Italy.

The Embassy at Naples closed November 6, 1860.

Diplomatic relations were severed and the U.S. Embassy in Rome was closed on December 11, 1941, after Italy declared war on the United States. Diplomatic relations were reestablished on October 16, 1944. Ambassador Alexander C. Kirk reopened the U.S. Embassy in Rome when he presented his credentials on January 8, 1945.

See also
Italian Embassy, Washington, D.C.
Embassy of the United States, Rome
Italy – United States relations
Foreign relations of Italy
Ambassadors of the United States
List of ambassadors of Italy to the United States

References

United States Department of State: Background notes on Italy

External links
 United States Department of State: Chiefs of Mission for Italy
 United States Department of State: Italy
 United States Embassy in Rome

Italy
United States